Route 24 is a limited-access state highway in the U.S. state of Rhode Island. Route 24  is the primary freeway access for the two towns in the southeastern corner of the state, Tiverton and Little Compton. Though on the mainland, they are isolated from the rest of the state by an arm of the Narragansett Bay. Because of this, the main freeway connection to Providence involves using Rhode Island Route 24, Massachusetts Route 24, and Interstate 195.

Route description
Route 24 starts at Route 114 in Portsmouth. It heads northeast and has a short concurrency with Route 138 over the Sakonnet River Bridge to Tiverton. It continues northeast until the border with Fall River, Massachusetts, where it continues as Massachusetts Route 24.

Exit list
Exits were formerly numbered only on gore signs until 2014, when a project put numbers on all signs except for at Fish Road. All interchanges in Rhode Island, including Route 24, will be renumbered to mileage-based numbers by 2020 under a plan announced by RIDOT in the fall of 2017. In November 2019, RIDOT announced that Route 24 will be renumbering the exits in Spring 2020.

See also

 Rhode Island Route 4

References

External links
2019 Highway Map, Rhode Island

024
Transportation in Newport County, Rhode Island
Freeways in the United States
Tiverton, Rhode Island
Portsmouth, Rhode Island